The Department of Jobs, Precincts and Regions (DJPR) was a department in Victoria, Australia. Commencing operation on 1 January 2019, the DJPR supported six ministers across 10 portfolios, broadly related to economic development.

Along with the Department of Transport (DoT), DJPR was created in machinery of government changes following the return of the Labor government led by Premier Daniel Andrews at the 2018 state election, in which the Department of Economic Development, Jobs, Transport and Resources (DEDJTR) was divided into two new departments. Following the resignation of Richard Bolt as Secretary of DEDJTR, Simon Phemister was appointed Acting Secretary, and continued as permanent Secretary of the new department.

In addition to the non-transport functions of DEDJTR, DJPR also took on responsibility for suburban development from the Department of Environment, Land, Water and Planning; racing from the Department of Justice and Regulation (itself renamed to the Department of Justice and Community Safety); and Sport and Recreation Victoria from the Department of Health and Human Services.

The department was replaced by the Department of Jobs, Skills, Industry and Regions on 1 January 2023, with the latter taking over almost all responsibilities except resources and agriculture, which were transferred to the Department of Energy, Environment and Climate Action and local government, which was transferred to the Department of Government Services. The new department also took over responsibilities for skills, training and higher education from the Department of Education and Training.

Ministers
, the DJPR supports seven ministers in the following portfolios:

Functions
The DJPR had responsibility for the following policy areas:
 Economic development
 Industry
 Agriculture
 Creative industries
 Employment
 Major events and tourism
 Industrial relations
 Mining and resources
 Regional development
 Small business
 Racing
 Sport and recreation 
 Suburban development
 Trade and investment
 Local government

References

External links

Organisational chart (Jan 2020)

Jobs, Precincts and Regions
Ministries established in 2019
Economy of Victoria (Australia)
2019 establishments in Australia
Victoria
Victoria
Victoria
Victoria